The List of National Historic Landmarks in Montana contains the landmarks designated by the U.S. Federal Government for the U.S. state of Montana.  There are 28 National Historic Landmarks (NHLs) in Montana.

The United States National Historic Landmark program is operated under the auspices of the National Park Service, and recognizes structures, districts, objects, and similar resources nationwide according to a list of criteria of national significance.
The Montana landmarks emphasize its frontier heritage, the passage of the Lewis and Clark Expedition, Montana's contributions to the national park movement, and other themes.

Three sites in Montana extend across the Idaho or North Dakota state line, and are listed by the National Park Service as Idaho NHLs or North Dakota NHLs.



|}

See also

Historic preservation
History of Montana
National Register of Historic Places listings in Montana

References

External links 
National Historic Landmark Program at the National Park Service
Lists of National Historic Landmarks

Montana
 
National Historic Landmarks
National Historic Landmarks